Agassac is a commune in the Haute-Garonne department in southwestern France.

Geography
The commune is bordered by five other communes: Martisserre to the north, Mauvezin to the east, Castelgaillard to the south Coueilles to the southwest, and finally by L'Isle-en-Dodon to the west.

Population

See also
Communes of the Haute-Garonne department

References

Communes of Haute-Garonne